The Guild of Music Supervisors Awards  recognize music supervisors in 14 categories, representing movies, television, games and trailers. Compton, Carol and Furious 7  were among the winners of the 2016 ceremony, while La La Land of the 2017 ceremony. The seventh annual ceremony took place at The Theatre at the Ace Hotel Los Angeles.

Categories
As of the 2017 ceremony.
Best Music Supervision for Films Budgeted Over $25 Million
Best Music Supervision for Films Budgeted Under $25 Million
Best Music Supervision for Films Budgeted Under $10 Million
Best Music Supervision for Films Budgeted Under $5 Million
Best Song Written and/or Recorded Created for a Film
Best Music Supervision in a Television Drama
Best Music Supervision in a Television Comedy
Best Music Supervision in a Docuseries or Reality Television
Best Music Supervision in a Television Limited Series or Movie
Best Song Written and/or Recorded for Television
Best Music Supervision for a Documentary 
Best Music Supervision for Trailers
Best Music Supervision for Video Games
Best Use of Music by a Music House
Best Use of Music by a Brand

References

External links

American film awards
Recurring events established in 2010
February events
Guild awards